Windspire Inc. was an American aircraft design firm based in Long Green, Maryland. The company specialized in the design of helicopters in the form of plans for amateur construction.

The company produced plans for the Windspire Aeros, a single seat helicopter powered by a four-cylinder, air-cooled, four-stroke,  Volkswagen air-cooled engine. The design includes a drive train based on Volkswagen gears.

Aircraft

References

External links
 - former location

Defunct aircraft manufacturers of the United States
Homebuilt aircraft
Helicopters